A circumplanetary disk (or circumplanetary disc) is a torus, pancake or ring-shaped accumulation of matter composed of gas, dust, planetesimals, asteroids or collision fragments in orbit around a planet. Around the planets, they are the reservoirs of material out of which moons (or exomoons or subsatellites) may form. Such a disk can manifest itself in various ways.

In August 2018 astronomers reported the probable detection of a circumplanetary disk around CS Cha B. The authors state that "The CS Cha system is the only system in which a circumplanetary disc is likely present as well as a resolved circumstellar disc." In 2020 though, the parameters of CS Cha B were revised, making it an accreting red dwarf star, and making the disk circumstellar.

In June 2019 astronomers reported the detection of evidence of a circumplanetary disk around PDS 70b using spectroscopy and accretion signatures. Both types of these signatures were also detected for other planetary candidates before. A later infrared characterization could not confirm the spectroscopic evidence for the disk around PDS 70b and reports weak evidence that the current data favors a model with a single blackbody component. In July 2019 astronomers reported the first-ever detection using the Atacama Large Millimeter/submillimeter Array (ALMA) of a circumplanetary disk. ALMA studies, using millimetre and submillimetre wavelengths, are better at observing dust concentrated in interplanetary regions, since stars emit comparatively little light at these wavelengths, and since optical observations are often fraught with overwhelming glare from the bright host star.

The circumplanetary disk was detected around a young massive, Jupiter-like exoplanet, PDS 70c; another such disk may have been detected around the related massive, Jupiter-like exoplanet, PDS 70b, as well.

According to Andrea Isella, lead researcher from the Rice University in Houston, Texas, "For the first time, we can conclusively see the tell-tale signs of a circumplanetary disk, which helps to support many of the current theories of planet formation ... By comparing our observations to the high-resolution infrared and optical images, we can clearly see that an otherwise enigmatic concentration of tiny dust particles is actually a planet-girding disk of dust, the first such feature ever conclusively observed." Jason Wang from Caltech, lead researcher of another publication describes, "if a planet appears to sit on top of the disk, which is the case with PDS 70c" then the signal around PDS 70c needs to be spatially separated from the outer ring, not the case in 2019. However, in July 2021 higher resolution, conclusively resolved data were presented.

Possible circumplanetary disks have also been detected around Cha 110913−773444, 2M1207b, J1407b, HD 100546 b, GSC 06214-00210 b, DH Tauri b, AS 209 b, and HD 169142 b.

See also 

 Accretion disc
 Circumplanetary dust
 Circumstellar envelope
 Disrupted planet
 Extrasolar planet
 Formation and evolution of the Solar System
 Protoplanetary disk

References

External links 
Image Gallery of Circumstellar Dust disks (Paul Kalas; "Learning Site)"
  (ESO; July 2021)